The following is a list of churches in the unitary authority of Peterborough

Active churches 
The unitary authority has an estimated 84 active churches for 197,100 inhabitants, a ratio of one church to every 2,346 people.

There are no active churches in the civil parishes of Borough Fen, Deeping Gate, Southorpe, St Martin's Without, Ufford and Wothorpe.

Defunct churches

Map of medieval parish churches

Cambridgeshire

Central Cambridge

References 

Peterborough
 
Churches
Lists of buildings and structures in Cambridgeshire